Protective order may refer to:

Injunction
Restraining order
In civil discovery under United States federal law, an order restricting or setting terms for disclosure or discovery